These are the results of the men's floor exercise competition, one of eight events for male competitors of the artistic gymnastics discipline contested in the gymnastics at the 2004 Summer Olympics in Athens. The qualification and final rounds took place on August 14 and August 22 at the Olympic Indoor Hall.

Results

Qualification

Seventy-seven gymnasts competed in the floor exercise event in the artistic gymnastics qualification round on August 14.
The eight highest scoring gymnasts advanced to the final on August 22.

Final

References
Gymnastics Results.com

Men's floor
2004
Men's events at the 2004 Summer Olympics